The eighth series of Geordie Shore, a British television programme based in Newcastle upon Tyne was confirmed in October 2013 after cast member Holly Hagan announced it on Twitter and is expected to air 22 July 2014. Filming began for this series on 25 March 2014. This series will be the first not to feature former cast member Sophie Kasaei after she was axed during the seventh series following a racial slur. All other cast members from the previous series return with the addition of new cast member Aaron Chalmers who had briefly appeared during series two of the show as a one-night stand of Holly's. In May 2014, Gaz announced that the series would begin in July. An exclusive first trailer for the series was released during an episode of Ex On The Beach on 3 June 2014. It was revealed on 10 June 2014 that another new cast member had joined, 21-year-old Kyle Christie.

Cast
Aaron Chalmers
Charlotte-Letitia Crosby
Gary Beadle
Holly Hagan
James Tindale
Kyle Christie
Marnie Simpson
Scott Timlin
Vicky Pattison

Duration of cast 

 = Cast member is featured in this episode.
 = Cast member arrives in the house.
 = Cast member voluntarily leaves the house.
 = Cast member leaves and returns to the house in the same episode.
 = Cast member returns to the house.
 = Cast member does not feature in this episode.
 = Cast member is not officially a cast member in this episode.

Episodes

Ratings

References

2014 British television seasons
Series 08